The Unmentionables is a 1963 Warner Bros. Merrie Melodies cartoon directed by Friz Freleng. The short was released on September 7, 1963, and stars Bugs Bunny. It features Bugs with Rocky and Mugsy (in their final appearance), and spoofs The Untouchables, a popular television crime drama (complete with an impression of Walter Winchell's frantic narration by Ralph James; this was one of the few instances where someone other than Mel Blanc was credited with a voice role on a Warner Bros. cartoon. Julie Bennett was not credited for her voice work.

In this cartoon, Bugs takes on the role of crime fighter Elegant Mess (a comedic reference to Eliot Ness). To design this cartoon, director Friz Freleng and his team studied the works of John Held Jr.  This was the last Bugs Bunny cartoon that Freleng directed in the original classic era of Looney Tunes.

The title is also a synonym for "underwear". The cartoon later appeared (combined with two other Rocky and Mugsy cartoons) in The Looney Looney Looney Bugs Bunny Movie (1981).

Plot

The narrator explains how the Roaring Twenties was a time of jazz, new fashion trends, dance parties, and mobster violence. Over in Washington D.C., Bugs Bunny (addressed as Agent Elegant Mess in this cartoon) is assigned by his chief to infiltrate the gangster underworld in Chicago. As Bugs takes a taxi out to Chicago, he discovers that it has been compromised by Rocky and Mugsy.

At the hideout, Rocky and Mugsy have tied up Bugs and given him the concrete shoes treatment. Both men then throw Bugs into Lake Michigan in the dark of the night, but Bugs manages to use a pipe as a snorkel and hop out of the lake.

The next night, the gangsters decide to throw a party to celebrate Rocky's birthday and the (supposed) death of Bugs. Mugsy announces Rocky's entertainment just as Bugs pops out of the cake, disguised as a flapper. Just as Rocky comes up to Bugs to flirt with him, Bugs kicks Rocky upside the jaw, making him drop his guns. The third kick to his posterior has Rocky so deep under his hat that he has to feel the floor for his guns and fire aimlessly.

Once Bugs flees, Rocky sees he has been set up and orders all of the gangsters in attendance to capture Bugs, but they all fall to the floor dead (Rocky having shot them by accident). Bugs comes in, disguised as a police inspector, and books Rocky for murder. Determined not to be booked, Rocky whips out a revolver. Bugs then whips out a carrot, which Rocky and Mugsy find funny, until the carrot's end opens up and blasts them.

Rocky then retaliates with real gunfire and he and Mugsy chase Bugs across town into a factory and up a set of stairs into what is supposedly a storeroom. Bugs then escapes, locks the door, and runs down the stairs. A light then goes on revealing that the three characters are in the ACME Cereal Factory. Bugs then throws a switch, which sends Rocky and Mugsy into a mixer, then the popper. When the cereals come out on the conveyor belts, the crooks have been boxed up.

The next day, with Rocky and Mugsy apprehended, Bugs takes them to Juliet Prison to spend 20 years of hard labor. We see in the final shot that a disgruntled Bugs is joining them in the sentence, as the narrator explains that Bugs had lost the keys to the handcuffs.

See also 

 List of Bugs Bunny cartoons

References

External links
 
 The Unmentionables at The Big Cartoon Database

1963 films
1963 animated films
1963 short films
1960s parody films
Merrie Melodies short films
Warner Bros. Cartoons animated short films
Short films directed by Friz Freleng
Films set in the 1920s
Films set in Chicago
Films set in Washington, D.C.
Films scored by William Lava
Bugs Bunny films
1963 comedy films
1960s Warner Bros. animated short films
1960s English-language films
Rocky and Mugsy films